Nam-jun, sometimes spelled Nam-joon, is an uncommon Korean masculine given name. According to the naming website Erumy, the name ranked as the 2,973rd most popular given name throughout South Korea and is most commonly used in the common family name Kim, as of September 2020. There are 6 hanja with the reading "nam" and 43 with "jun" on the South Korean government's official list of hanja which may be registered for use in given names.

Popularity 
The name was most popular in 1994.

People 
Nam June Paik (1932–2006), Korean-American pioneer in video art
RM (born Kim Nam-joon, 1994), South Korean rapper
Park Nam-jun (born 1957), South Korean poet

Fictional characters 

 Nam-joon, character in the comedy drama film The Last Ride
 Ahn Nam-joon, main character in the television series Sweet Buns
 Kim Nam-joon, main character in the television series Youth
 Kim Nam-joon, main character in the television series Left-Handed Wife

See also 

 List of Korean given names

References 

Given names
Korean masculine given names